Hazel Soan is a British artist working out of studios in London and Cape Town and on location throughout the world.

She paints in watercolour and oil and is known particularly for her direct wet-into-wet watercolour approach and her use of rich pigment and strong contrasts of light and shade. Shape, interval and tone are her predominant subject matter. Figures, African wildlife and action are the main source of reference.

Her work is represented in private and public collections worldwide, including the National Portrait Gallery, the Lister Institute, the Chelsea and Westminster Hospital, the Ritz, other London and International Hotels, the British Embassy in Ankara and the EU Delegation in Windhoek.
Hazel has held numerous solo exhibitions, mainly in London and the UK, but also in Venezuela, Namibia and Zimbabwe. She has participated in mixed exhibitions, including Royal Academy, Barbican Centre, Midland Open, Mall Galleries, David Shepherd Wildlife Foundation.

Hazel is a natural and talented communicator. She became popular for her television role as an Art Expert on Channel 4’s Watercolour Challenge and her own series, Anglia TV’s Splash of Colour.

Her passion for painting is shared through books, DVD films, workshops, lectures and painting holidays, demonstrating the vibrant immediacy of the watercolour medium and the properties of watercolour pigments. She is the author of more than 15 books and contributes articles regularly to The Artist magazine and other art titles.

References

External links 
 Official website
 AllSoanUp - A Collection of Hazel Soan's Art

Living people
British painters
British watercolourists
Year of birth missing (living people)